Law enforcement in the Republic of Artsakh is inconsistently enforced, as the region is a de facto independent republic and officially part of Azerbaijan. Law enforcement in Nagorno-Karabakh is the responsibility of the Interior Ministry and the NSS.

Police of Artsakh 

After the annexation of Artsakh to the Azerbaijan SSR, on 4 August 1923, the People's Commissariat for Internal Affairs of the Nagorno-Karabakh Autonomous Oblast was established. In the years following the First Nagorno-Karabakh War, the Republic of Artsakh created its own police force. In 2001, the National Assembly's law "On Police" was adopted on 30 November 2006. On 11 March 2014, Police Day in Artsakh was declared for 16 April. The police force follows an organization similar to that of the Police of Armenia.

National Security Service 
Artsakh has its own National Security Service, based on the NSS of Armenia. It is a republican body that elaborates and implements the policies of the government in the national security sector. By decree of the NKR Supreme Council adopted on 18 January 2006, the NKAO State Security Department was named the State Department of National Security under the NKR Council of Ministers. By order of the NKR National Assembly on 26 November 2003, the NKR laws "On National Security Bodies" and "On Service in National Security Bodies" were adopted. The current activities of the NSS are based in the decrees of 25 September 2012. The NSS is currently headed by Lieutenant General Kamo Aghajanyan.

See also 
 Police of Armenia

Links 
Police website
NSS of Artsakh

References 

Republic of Artsakh